Tim, Timothy or Timmy Smith may refer to:

Musicians
T. V. Smith (born 1956), British singer and songwriter
Tim Smith (Cardiacs) (1961–2020), English singer-songwriter and frontman of Cardiacs
Tim Smith, lead singer of Midlake
Tim Smith, drummer with Poco
Tim Smith, bass guitarist of The Brew

Politics
Tim Smith (British politician) (born 1947), former House of Commons politician
Timothy Smith (New Hampshire politician) (born 1980), New Hampshire House of Representatives politician
Tim Smith (Australian politician) (born 1983), Victorian Legislative Assembly politician

Sports
Timothy Smith (cricketer, born 1953), English cricketer
Tim Smith (American football) (born 1957), American football wide receiver
Timmy Smith (born 1964), American football running back
Tim Smith (ice hockey) (born 1981), Canadian ice hockey player
Tim Smith (basketball) (born 1982), American professional basketball player
Timothy Smith (cricketer, born 1983), English cricketer
Tim Smith (rugby league) (born 1985), Australian rugby league player
Tim Smith (baseball) (born 1986), Canadian baseball player
Tim Smith (Australian footballer) (born 1991), Australian rules footballer for Melbourne

Other people
Timothy L. Smith (1924–1997), religious historian
Timothy Smith (psychologist) (fl. 1970s–2020s), American psychologist
Tim Smith (DJ) (born 1961), presenter on BBC Radio 2
Tim Smith (journalist) (fl. 2000s), music editor of the Baltimore Sun
Timothy John Smith (actor) (fl. 2000s–2010s), American actor
Tim Smith, producer and writer

Fictional
Tim Smith (One Tree Hill), a character on One Tree Hill portrayed by Brett Claywell